The Napoleon Bonaparte Monument was erected to honor the French emperor Napoleon Bonaparte on the 190th anniversary of his death. Napoleon established the Duchy of Warsaw in 1807 from the Polish lands ceded by the Kingdom of Prussia under the terms of the Treaties of Tilsit. The duchy was held in personal union by one of Napoleon's allies, King Frederick Augustus I of Saxony. Following Napoleon's failed invasion of Russia, the duchy was occupied by Prussian and Russian troops until 1815, when it was formally partitioned between the two countries at the Congress of Vienna. It covered central and eastern part of present Poland and minor parts of present Lithuania and Belarus.

Monuments and memorials in Warsaw
Warsaw
2011 sculptures
2011 establishments in Poland